Diamonds, is a 1947 Soviet film directed by Aleksandr Olenin and Ivan Pravov.

Plot 
The film tells about the geologist Sergey Nesterov, who, after completing his military service, plans to start again to search for industrial deposits of Ural diamonds. His zeal has no limits and he persists in realizing his goal

Starring 
 Vsevolod Sanaev as Sergei Nesterov
 Vasili Vanin as Ignat Salamatov
 Nina Alisova as Varvara Menshikova
 Yevgeniy Agurov 
 Anastasiya Kozhevnikova 
 Ioakim Maksimov-Koshkinskiy 
 Lidiya Starokoltseva

References

External links 
 

1947 films
1940s Russian-language films
Soviet black-and-white films
Soviet drama films
1947 drama films